Agnimrigam is a 1971 Indian Malayalam film, directed by M. Krishnan Nair. The film stars Prem Nazir, Sathyan, Sheela and K. P. Ummer in the lead roles. The film had musical score by G. Devarajan. It is based on The Hound of the Baskervilles. It was a commercial success.

Cast

Prem Nazir as Ramesh
Sathyan as Mukundan
Sheela as Bhanumathi
K. P. Ummer as Raveendran
Ravichandran as Vijayan
Adoor Bhasi as P. C. Pillai
Adoor Pankajam as Karthyayini
Alummoodan as Dominic
G. K. Pillai as Jayapalan
Jayakumari as Valli
Joshiy as Murderer
Kottayam Chellappan as Kailasanathan
S. P. Pillai as Shankunni

Plot
The movie was an adaptation of Sir Arthur Conan Doyle's The Hound of the Baskervilles.

Soundtrack
The music was composed by G. Devarajan and the lyrics were written by Vayalar Ramavarma.

References

External links
 

1971 films
1970s Malayalam-language films
Films directed by M. Krishnan Nair